TCG Bozcaada (F-500) is the lead ship of the six  ASW corvettes of the Turkish Navy. She was named after Bozcaada Island,  which is in the northern part of the Aegean Sea. Bozcaada is an ex- A69 type aviso.

Service history 
The ship was built in 1978 in France and served as  Commandant de Pimodan with the identification number F787 in the French Navy. She was transferred to the Turkish Navy in 2001.

On 2 August 2012, she was tasked to escort the Turkish cargo vessel  on the first leg of her voyage to Somalia from Port of Mersin to Suez Port in eastern Mediterranean Sea. The cargo ship carried aid materials dispatched by the Turkish Red Crescent to Somalia, which was drought stricken as a result of the 2011 East Africa drought.

References

External links

Ships built in France
1978 ships
Ships transferred from the French Navy to the Turkish Navy
Burak-class corvettes of the Turkish Navy